Charaxes has several meanings:

Charaxes, the genus of pasha and radjah butterflies
The name taken by the comic book villain Killer Moth after his transformation into an actual killer moth-like creature.